The billiards and snooker competitions at the 2017 Southeast Asian Games in Kuala Lumpur were held at Kuala Lumpur Convention Centre of Kuala Lumpur City Centre.

The 2017 Games featured competitions in seven events (6 events for men and 1 event for women).

Events
The following events will be contested:

Schedule

Participation

Participating nations

Medal summary

Medal table

Men

Women

References

External links